Edward Copleston (2 February 177614 October 1849) was an English churchman and academic, Provost of Oriel College, Oxford, from 1814 till 1828 and Bishop of Llandaff from 1827.

Life
Born into an ancient West Country family, Copleston was born at Offwell in Devon, and educated at Corpus Christi College, Oxford, to which he gained a scholarship at the age of 15.

He was elected to a tutorship at Oriel College, Oxford, in 1797, and in 1800 was appointed to St Mary Hall, Oxford and also became Vicar of the University Church of St Mary the Virgin, Oxford. As Oxford Professor of Poetry (1802–1812) he gained a reputation by his literary criticism and sound latinity.

After holding the office of dean at Oriel for some years, he succeeded to the provostship in 1814, and owing largely to his influence the college reached a remarkable degree of prosperity during the first quarter of the 19th century. He was influential in the choice of Fellows who were in due course to become prominent during the Oxford Movement, though he himself was of a more rationalist cast of mind and belonged to the group of so-called Oriel Noetics.

In 1826 he was appointed Dean of Chester, and in the next year he was consecrated Bishop of Llandaff. Here he gave his support to the new movement for church restoration in Wales, and during his occupation of the see more than twenty new churches were built in the diocese. The political problems of the time interested him greatly, and his writings include two letters to Sir Robert Peel, one dealing with the 'Variable Standard of Value', the other with the 'Increase of Pauperism' (Oxford, 1819). 

The palace of the Bishops of Llandaff (at Mathern, Monmouthshire) had been sold so Copleston resided occasionally at Llandough Castle near Cowbridge and passed his later life between the Deanery of St.Paul's and Hardwick House in Chepstow, where he died. 

His great-grandson, John Copleston, was also a clergyman.

Notes

References

External links

1776 births
1849 deaths
English theologians
Alumni of Corpus Christi College, Oxford
Provosts of Oriel College, Oxford
Bishops of Llandaff
People from East Devon District
Deans of Chester
Deans of St Paul's
19th-century Welsh Anglican bishops
Oxford Professors of Poetry